

Plants

Newly named angiosperms

Fish

Bony fish

Dinosaurs

Newly named dinosaurs
Data courtesy of George Olshevsky's dinosaur genera list and Dr. Jeremy Montague's dinosaur genus database.

Plesiosaurs

Newly named taxa

Synapsids

Non-mammalian

References

1910s in paleontology
Paleontology
Paleontology 6